Anarchism is a political philosophy and movement that calls for the abolition of the state.

Anarchism may also refer to:
 Anarchism (Eltzbacher book), a 1900 survey of anarchism by Paul Eltzbacher
 Anarchism (Miller book), a 1984 survey of anarchism by David Miller
 Anarchism (Ritter book), a 1981 book on anarchism as a political theory by Alan Ritter
 Anarchism (Woodcock book), a 1962 history of anarchism by George Woodcock

See also
 Anarchist (disambiguation)
 Anarchy (disambiguation)